Mark Anthony Maddox (born March 23, 1968) is a former professional American football linebacker for ten seasons in the NFL for the Buffalo Bills and Arizona Cardinals. He played college football at Northern Michigan University.

He attended James Madison High School and then Northern Michigan University.

1968 births
Living people
American football linebackers
Buffalo Bills players
Arizona Cardinals players
Northern Michigan Wildcats football players
Players of American football from Milwaukee
Ed Block Courage Award recipients